Election is a 1999 American black comedy film directed by Alexander Payne from a screenplay by Payne and Jim Taylor, based on Tom Perrotta's 1998 novel of the same name.

The plot revolves around a student body election and satirizes politics and high school life. The film stars Matthew Broderick as Jim McAllister, a popular high school social studies teacher, and Reese Witherspoon as Tracy Flick, an overachieving student whom he dislikes. When Tracy runs for student government president, Jim sabotages her candidacy by backing a rival candidate and tampering with the ballot count.

Although not a success at the box office, Election received widespread critical acclaim. The film received an Academy Awards nomination for Best Adapted Screenplay, a Golden Globe nomination for Witherspoon for Best Actress, and the Independent Spirit Award for Best Film in 1999.

Plot
The film is narrated by main characters Jim, Tracy, Paul, and Tammy, as a collection of interviews about a high school election fraud scandal.

Jim McAllister teaches U.S. history and civics at Carver High School in Omaha, Nebraska. One of his students is Tracy Flick, an overachieving junior. Jim's colleague and best friend Dave lost his job and wife after engaging in a sexual relationship with Tracy. While Jim felt Dave needed to suffer consequences, he resents Tracy for emerging unscathed, largely due to coddling by her mother, and her personality.

Appalled by Tracy's unopposed run for student government president, Jim persuades Paul Metzler, a popular, good-natured, but dimwitted football player, to enter the race. Paul is sidelined from football with a broken leg and finds his candidacy gives him purpose. It also infuriates Tracy, who can't fathom being challenged.

Tammy Metzler, Paul's adopted younger sister, is dumped by her girlfriend Lisa, who becomes Paul's girlfriend and campaign manager. Tammy exacts revenge by running for president herself. In her speech at a school assembly, she denounces student government as a sham and vows to dissolve it if she wins. She rallies the students to a rowdy standing ovation, but the principal retaliates by suspending her.

Late one night, Tracy sees that one of her campaign posters has come unstuck from the wall. She tries to secure it but accidentally rips the poster apart. In a fit of rage, she destroys the other candidates' campaign posters and discards them in a dumpster, unaware that Tammy sees her. The next day, Jim confronts Tracy with his suspicion that she removed the posters. Tracy feigns innocence and trades threats with Jim. She is saved by Tammy, who appears with the torn posters and claims responsibility. Tammy is expelled and her name struck from the ballot.

The day before the election, Jim has a tryst with Linda, Dave's ex-wife. Linda asks Jim to rent a motel room for an afterschool rendezvous, but she fails to show. When Jim drives to Linda's house to find her, he is stung by a bee on his eyelid. He returns home to find Linda and his wife Diane talking. Knowing Linda has exposed their encounter, he spends the night in his car.

Jim oversees the tally of the ballots, which finds Tracy winning by a single vote. Seeing Tracy peering in on the vote count and preemptively celebrating, he spitefully disposes of two of Tracy's ballots, throwing the election to Paul. The ballots are later discovered, and Tracy becomes president. Jim is forced to resign, and the election rigging makes headlines. Further, Diane divorces Jim, taking the house and most of their joint assets. 

Humiliated, Jim moves to New York City, becoming a tour guide at the American Museum of Natural History, and begins dating a new woman. Paul develops an active social life at the University of Nebraska, though without Lisa, who dumps him. Tammy finds a new girlfriend at her all-girls private Catholic school. Tracy attends Georgetown University, where she similarly isolates herself from her peers due to her work-centric nature, and is dismayed many of her classmates were admitted through sliding by on connections. Tracy misses Dave's intellect and wonders if he became a novelist as she believed he would; the film shows Dave working in a big box store.

On a visit to Washington, D.C., Jim spots Tracy getting into a limousine with a congressman. Infuriated that she will go through life as she did at Carver, he hurls a cup of soda at the limo's backglass before fleeing. The film ends with Jim at the museum asking some elementary students a question; an overeager little girl is the only one to respond.

Cast

Production
Producers Albert Berger and Ron Yerxa sent director Alexander Payne an unpublished manuscript from novelist Tom Perrotta called "Election" in 1996. Payne was initially uninterested in directing a high school movie, but changed his mind after he read the manuscript. "It was set in a high school, but it wasn’t a high school story, per se. Also what attracted me was the formal exercise of doing a movie with multiple points of view and multiple voice-overs," said Payne. The novel's rights were sold to Payne in January 1997 and it was officially published in March 1998.

The novel was inspired by two key events. The first was the 1992 United States presidential election, in which Ross Perot entered as a third-party candidate (a move echoed by Tammy Metzler). The second was a 1992 incident at Memorial High School in Eau Claire, Wisconsin, in which a pregnant student was elected homecoming queen, but staff announced a different winner and burned the ballots to cover it up.

The film uses a number of stylized techniques in its storytelling, particularly through the use of freeze frames, flashbacks and voiceovers, which allow sections of the narrative to be delivered from the points of view of the four main characters.

The film was primarily shot on location around the Omaha metro area in the fall of 1997, most notably in Papillion, Bellevue and the Dundee neighborhood. Papillion-La Vista Senior High School portrayed the fictitious Carver High School with many of the background extras being actual enrolled students at the time. Minor scenes were filmed at Younkers in Westroads Mall, the Old Market and the Henry Doorly Zoo and Aquarium.

Alternate ending
The film's original ending, which was received poorly by test audiences, was not known until a rough workprint of it was found in a box of VHS tapes at a yard sale in 2011. This ending also appears in the third draft of the script, which can be read online. It is faithful to the book: Jim stays in Omaha and is hired as a used car salesman by one of his former students instead of moving to New York. Tracy encounters Jim while looking to buy a car and the two settle their differences before she has him sign her yearbook.

Reception 

Election was not a box office success as it grossed only $17.2 million against a budget of $8.5-$25 million.

Critical response 
Election received critical acclaim. On Rotten Tomatoes, the film holds a rating of 92%, based on 114 reviews, with an average rating of 7.90/10. The critical consensus reads, "Election successfully combines dark humor and intelligent writing in this very witty and enjoyable film." On Metacritic, the film has a score of 83 out of 100, based on 33 reviews, indicating "universal acclaim". Audiences surveyed by CinemaScore gave the film a grade "B−" on scale of A to F. It later placed at #5 in the first annual Village Voice Film Poll.

Roger Ebert gave the film three and a half out of four stars, praising Witherspoon and Payne, and saying, "...here is a movie that is not simply about an obnoxious student, but also about an imperfect teacher, a lockstep administration, and a student body that is mostly just marking time until it can go out into the world and occupy valuable space". 

Todd McCarthy of Variety wrote: "Brandishes the sort of intelligent wit and bracing nastiness that will make it more appealing to discerning adults than to teens who just want to have fun." 

Desson Howe from The Washington Post recommended the film, saying it was "the satire of the season, a hilarious, razor-sharp indictment of the American Dream," also praising Payne for finding "a perfect fulcrum between humor and tragedy, between black comedy and poignancy."

According to Payne, it is also President Barack Obama's favorite political film.

Accolades 

Election is ranked #61 on Bravo's "100 Funniest Movies", #389 on Empire's "500 Greatest Movies of All Time" and #9 on Entertainment Weekly'''s list of the "50 Best High School Movies", while Witherspoon's performance was ranked at #45 on the list of the "100 Greatest Film Performances of All Time" by Premiere.

Home mediaElection'' was released on DVD on October 19, 1999, and Blu-ray on January 20, 2009. A special edition Blu-ray was released by The Criterion Collection on December 16, 2017, with a 4K restoration of the film.

References

External links

 
 
 
 
 
 Election: That’s Why It’s Destiny an essay by Dana Stevens at the Criterion Collection
   Ann Hornaday, "The 34 best political movies ever made" The Washington Post (Jan. 23, 2020), ranked #16

1990s black comedy films
1990s high school films
1990s satirical films
1990s teen comedy films
1999 comedy films
1999 films
1999 independent films
1999 LGBT-related films
American black comedy films
American high school films
American independent films
American LGBT-related films
American political satire films
American teen comedy films
American teen LGBT-related films
1990s English-language films
Films about academic scandals
Films about elections
Films about teacher–student relationships
Films based on American novels
Films directed by Alexander Payne
Films scored by Rolfe Kent
Films set in Nebraska
Films set in New York City
Films set in Washington, D.C.
Films shot in Iowa
Films shot in Nebraska
Films shot in Washington, D.C.
Films with screenplays by Alexander Payne
Films with screenplays by Jim Taylor (writer)
Independent Spirit Award for Best Film winners
Lesbian-related films
LGBT-related black comedy films
LGBT-related satirical films
MTV Films films
Paramount Pictures films
Films about scandalous teacher–student relationships
1990s American films